Indigenous peoples in Quebec total 11 distinct ethnic groups. The 10 First Nations and the Inuit communities number 141,915 people and account for approximately 2 percent of the population of Quebec, Canada.

First Nations

Algonquian

Abenaki 

The Abenaki comprise two First Nations communities named the Odanak First Nation (in Odanak, near Trois-Rivières) and the Wolinak First Nation (in Wôlinak, near Trois-Rivières). They number approximately 1,900 people.

Anishinaabeg 

The Algonquin, who refer to themselves as Anishinaabeg, comprise nine First Nations who live in communities located in the Outaouais and Abitibi-Témiscamingue regions of Quebec. These First Nations communities are:

Abitibiwinni First Nation in Pikogan
Algonquins of Barriere Lake in Lac-Rapide
Eagle Village First Nation - Kipawa in Kebaowek
Kitcisakik First Nation in Kitcisakik
Kitigan Zibi Anishinabeg First Nation in Kitigan Zibi
Long Point First Nation in Winneway
Nation Anishinaabe du Lac Simon in Lac-Simon
Timiskaming First Nation in Timiskaming
Wolf Lake First Nation in Hunter's Point

The Algonquin number approximately 12,000 people.

Atikamekw 

The three Atikamek (sometimes spelled Atikamekw) bands live in four communities located in the Maurice region of Quebec. These First Nations are:

Atikamekw d'Opitciwan in Obedjiwan
Atikamekw de Manawan in Manawan
Conseil des Atikamekw de Wemotaci  in Wemotaci and Coucoucache

The Atikamek number approximately 4,900 people.

Cree 

The Cree are the most populous nation in the Algonquian-language family. The majority live in Quebec and Ontario, but Cree also live in Manitoba, Alberta, and Saskatchewan. There are 10 Cree First Nations communities in northern Quebec. They are the:

Chisasibi First Nation in Chisasibi
Eastmain First Nation in Eastmain	  	
Mistissini First Nation in Mistissini
Nemaska First Nation in Nemaska	  	
Oujé-Bougoumou First Nation in Oujé-Bougoumou
Waskaganish First Nation in Waskaganish
Waswanipi First Nation in Waswanipi	
Wemindji First Nation in Wemindji
Whapmagoostui First Nation in Whapmagoostui
Washaw Sibi Eeyou in Amos
The Cree of Quebec number approximately 25,000 people.

Malecite 

The Malécite (or Maliseet, in an older English spelling) comprise one First Nation, the Première Nation Malecite de Viger, whose members live in two communities located in the Bas-St-Laurent region of Quebec. The communities are Cacouna and Whitworth. They number approximately 570 people.

Mi'kmaq 

The Mi'kmaq (or Micmac, in an older English spelling) live in the Canadian Maritime provinces and the Quebec region of the Gaspé Peninsula (French=Gaspésie). In Quebec, they number approximately 4,300 people and comprise three First Nations communities:

Gaspe First Nation in Gaspé	  	
Gesgapegiag First Nation in Gesgapegiag
Listuguj Mi'kmaq First Nation in Listuguj

Innu 

The Innu (formerly referred to as the Montagnais) comprise nine First Nations in the Côte-Nord region of Quebec. These First Nations are:

Bande des Innus de Pessamit (also known as ‘Pessamit Innu Band’ or Betsiamites First Nation) in Betsiamites
La Nation Innu Matimekush-Lac John (also known as ‘Innu Nation of Matimekush-Lac John’) in Lac-John and Matimekosh
Innue Essipit (known also as Essipit First Nation or ‘Montagnais Essipit’) in Essipit
Innu Takuaikan Uashat Mak Mani-Utenam in Maliotenam and Uashat	
Les Innus de Ekuanitshit in Mingan
Montagnais du Lac St.-Jean (also known as ‘Première nation des Pekuakamiulnuatsh’ or ‘Ilnuatsh du Pekuakami’) in Mashteuiatsh
Montagnais de Natashquan in Natashquan
Montagnais de Pakua Shipi in Pakuashipi
Montagnais de Unamen Shipu in La Romaine

The Innu number approximately 18,000 people.

Naskapi 

The Naskapi live in northern Quebec. They comprise one First Nation, the Naskapi Nation of Kawawachikamach, based in Kawawachikamach. They number approximately 1,000 people.

The Naskapi are recognized as a distinct nation by the governments of Quebec and Canada; however, they are often considered to be Innu living in a remote area.

Their main language is Naskapi and their second language is English. The Naskapi committee is known as the NLMB (The Naskapi Local Management Board).

Iroquoian

Wendats 

The members of the Huron-Wendat Nation live in Wendake, a reserve enclosed within Quebec City. Their original homeland was in Ontario. They number about 2,800 people. Their original language was Wendat, in the Iroquoian-language family.

Mohawk 

The Mohawk of Quebec number approximately 13,000 people. They comprise the three following First Nations, which were established at these locations in the colonial period:

Kahnawake First Nation in Kahnawake and Doncaster
Kanesatake First Nation in Kanesatake
Mohawk Nation of Akwesasne in Akwesasne

Inuit

The Inuit communities of Quebec are located in the northernmost part of the province, in an area known as Nunavik.  They number approximately 13,000 people. They were isolated from European encounter longer than other indigenous nations. There are Inuit communities at:

 Akulivik, Quebec
 Aupaluk, Quebec
 Inukjuak, Quebec
 Ivujivik, Quebec
 Kangiqsualujjuaq, Quebec
 Kangirsuk, Quebec
 Kuujjuaq, Quebec
 Kuujjuarapik, Quebec
 Puvirnituq, Quebec
 Quaqtaq, Quebec
 Salluit, Quebec

Recognized rights

James Bay and Northern Quebec Agreement
Charter of the French Language
Constitution of Canada
 United Nations conventions, covenants, & Treaties 
 Murray treaty 1760 
 Jay treaty 1794 
 Hopson Treaty 1752 
 Royal Proclamation 1763 
 UNDRIP, assented June 21, 2021

See also
Native Friendship Centre of Montreal
Demographics of Quebec
Demolinguistics of Quebec
Native American languages
Indigenous peoples of the Americas
First Nations
Aboriginal peoples in Canada
Template:First Nations in Quebec
 Metis Nation of Canada

External links
Map of the native communities in Quebec
Secrétariat aux affaires autochtones du Québec